Exilisia subfusca is a moth of the subfamily Arctiinae. It was described by J. C. F. Freyer in 1912. It is found on the Seychelles in the Indian Ocean.

References

Lithosiini
Moths described in 1912